Love Is What Stays is a 2007 studio album by Mark Murphy, arranged by Nan Schwartz and Till Brönner.

For Murphy's second Verve album, he is accompanied by figures including Lee Konitz, Don Grusin, the Deutsches Symphonie-Orchester Berlin, Chuck Loeb and Sebastian Merk.

Reception

The Allmusic review by Thom Jurek awarded the album four stars and said that Love Is What Stays "is a deeply satisfying and, in places, even astonishing reflection on time and its passage. Memory, reverie, regrets, victories, hipster mysticism, and wonderfully canny theatrically poetic wordplay all come to bear in these songs. It is more adventurous and downright wily in its aims than anyone could have hoped for." Jurek says that music fans looking "for true authenticity and artfully made American popular music, should snap this up as quickly as possible. Time will be the judge, but Love Is What Stays may become a Murphy masterpiece and - let's face it - the man embodies the very essence of "hip." And always will."

Track listing
 "Stolen Moments" (Mark Murphy, Oliver Nelson) - 2:40
 "Angel Eyes" (Earl Brent, Matt Dennis) - 8:06
 "My Foolish Heart" (Ned Washington, Victor Young) - 5:14
 "So Doggone Lonesome" (Johnny Cash) - 4:51
 "What If" (Guy Berryman, Jonny Buckland, Will Champion, Chris Martin) - 7:18
 "The Interview" (Murphy) - 5:41
 "Once Upon a Summertime" (Eddie Barclay, Michel Legrand, Eddy Marnay, Johnny Mercer) - 5:33
 "Stolen Moments (1st Reprise)" - 1:03
 "Love Is What Stays" (Till Brönner, Murphy) - 6:41
 "Stolen Moments (2nd Reprise)" - 1:22
 "Too Late Now" (Burton Lane, Alan Jay Lerner) - 7:54
 "Blue Cell Phone" (Murphy) - 3:04
 "Did I Ever Really Live" (Albert Hague, Allan Sherman) - 4:39

Personnel
Performance
Mark Murphy - vocals, arranger
Arne Schuhmann - accordion, horn engineer, mixing, rhythm engineer, vocal engineer
Christian VonKaphengst - arranger, double bass
Till Brönner - arranger, brass, fender rhodes, flugelhorn, producer, rhythm arrangements, trumpet
Nan Schwartz - arranger, conductor, orchestral arrangements, producer
Frank Chastenier - arranger, piano
Peter Pühn - double bass
Gregor Schaetz
Dávid Adorján - cello
Claudia Benker
Mathias Donderer
Andreas Grünkorn
Andreas Lichtschlag
Adele Schneider Bitter
Gregoire Peters - bass clarinet, flute, tenor saxophone
Matthias Schorn - clarinet
Joachim Welz
Sebastian Merk - drums
Don Grusin - fender rhodes
Kornelia Brandkamp - flute
Frauke Leopold
Frauke Ross
Raphael Weidlich
Christian Auer - french horn
Ozan Cakar
Markus Maskunitty
Sarah Christ - harp
Jürgen Hollerbuhl - oboe
Maximilian Baillie - viola
Anna Bortolin
Leo Klepper
Atsuko Matsuzaki
Annemarie Moorcroft
Raphael Sachs
Dieter Vogt
Verena Wehling
Mika Bamba - violin
Stefan Bitto
Nari Brandner
Elsa Brown
Tarla Grau
Thomas Grote
Isabel Grunkorn
Bertram Hartling
Marija Jeremic
Maxim Kosinov
Clemens Linder
Franziska Mantel
Thomas Otto
Vladislav Polyalkovsky
Paulina Quandt Marttila
Ingrid Schliephake
Andreas Schumann	
Sandra Tancibudek
Rüdiger Thal
Karsten Windt
Ksenija Zecevic
Kai Brückner - guitar
Johan Leijonhufvud	
Chuck Loeb
Karl Schloz
Torsten Maaß - rhythm arrangements
Christian Von Der Goltz
Lee Konitz - alto saxophone
Peter Weniger - soprano saxophone, tenor saxophone
Production
James Gavin - liner notes
Bernie Grundman - mastering
Lisa Hansen - release coordinator
Cameron Mizell
John Newcott
Mitja Arzensek - artwork, photography
Tobias Lehmann - engineer

References

Verve Records albums
Mark Murphy (singer) albums
2007 albums